Paratylenchus curvitatus is a plant pathogenic nematode infecting tea.

References

External links 
 Nemaplex, University of California - Paratylenchus

Tylenchida
Tea diseases
Agricultural pest nematodes